Dikrella cruentata, the blackberry leafhopper, is a species of leafhopper belonging to the family Cicadellidae.

References

Cicadellidae